Elk Rock Island is an island on the Willamette River in the U.S. state of Oregon. The 12- to 13-acre (4.9- to 5.3-ha) island, formed 40 million years ago by a volcano, was given to Portland by Peter Kerr in 1940. The city of Milwaukie took ownership of the park in April 2016. The island is accessible via Spring Park.

Ecology
The island contains deciduous forest, mixed evergreen-deciduous forest and perennial graminoid vegetation. It is one of the last stands of the Oregon White Oak.

References

External links

 Radio program broadcast in 2012

Islands of the Willamette River
Landforms of Clackamas County, Oregon
Milwaukie, Oregon
Parks in Clackamas County, Oregon